John Hondorp (born 1964 in Doetinchem, Netherlands) is a professor at the Enschede Conservatory. He was the first to teach Hammond organ as a fully autonome jazz major.

His international class of students come from all over the world to study with him in Enschede. In the last 10 years they came from the Netherlands, Germany, Switzerland, Sweden, Japan and Indonesia.
In March 2007 John was playing with the Enschede az Quintet "5-ESSENCE" (Quintessence) at the Indonesian "Java Jazz Festival" in Jakarta.

He has a master's degree in Hammond Organ from the Enschede Conservatory. He plays the jazz stages throughout Europe and toured with many European jazz artists like Ferdinand Povel, Judy Niemack, Bruno Castellucci, Nippy Noya. In 2004 he founded the John Hondorp Trio, with guitarist/composer Dominik Korte and drummer Marco Schmitz. After two seasons of playing they recorded the CD Open Stories in February 2006 at Organic Music Studio in Obing, Germany.

In 2007 John Hondorp was invited twice to perform and teach at Jazz festivals in Indonesia. His teaching activities were at UNJ (Universitas Negeri Jakarta), DAYA Music Institute and Universitas Pelita Harapan.

In 2008 John started his collaboration with German drummer Markus Strothmann. This collaboration grew into a strong duo "Transitions Organ duo". An energetic, flexible and highly interactive jazz playground. Regularly combined with featured soloists. In the last couple of years Transitions Organ Duo toured with Jeanfrançois Prins, Frederik Köster, Bart van Lier, Nippy Noya, Fredrik Lundin, Adrienne West Linley Hamilton, Bruno Castellucci and Darmon Meader.

Starting March 1, 2013, John was appointed teacher for Hammond Organ at the Institut für Musik in Osnabrück, Germany. This institute is the only music academy in Germany where one can study Hammond Organ as an independent jazz major instrument. He left the Osnabrück Institute in the summer of 2019.

Recordings 
Session (1995)
Lara's Dream - Martin Senders Quartett (2002)
JH Trio (2004) 
Renn Kwartet (2004) 
Open Stories, John Hondorp Trio, DKP 0601, (June 2006) 
 No Idea, Transitions (2013) Unit Records UTR 4493
 New Blues (Ruud Weber Band; 2014)  
 Some Favourite Songs (Ansgar Specht; 2016) 
 Ain't givin'up (Blues Company; 2019) 
 VPRO TV serie "Naar Bed" (2022)

External links 
 John Hondorp Personal Website
 Transitions Organ Duo Website

1964 births
Living people
Jazz organists
Dutch jazz musicians
People from Doetinchem
21st-century organists